The Duchy of Sorrento was a small peninsular duchy of the Early Middle Ages centred on the Italian city of Sorrento.  

Established in the 7th century as a fief of the Duchy of Naples, at the time still part of the Byzantine Empire.
Subsequently Duchy of Naples became de facto autonomous from the Byzantine Empire, and in 840, Sorrento in turn gained de facto independence from Duchy of Naples.
Both duchies remained only nominally territories under the control of the Byzantine Empire.

In 839 it resisted, with the help of the Duchy of Naples, under siege by the Lombard prince Sicard of Benevento, who the year before had conquered the Duchy of Amalfi.

Being the smallest and the most exposed, being on a peninsula, of the Campanian duchies, often it had to ally themselves to protect themselves from the ever-growing menace of the Saracens.

In 846, the Duchy of Sorrento joined the Lega Campana, promoted and established by Pope Leo IV for the defense of the Rome and the Papal States against the Saracens.
In the 849 summer, the Lega Campana, consisting of a fleet of ships of the duchies of Amalfi, Gaeta, Naples and Sorrento, under the guidance of the consul Cesarius, son of Duke Sergius I of Naples, defeated the Saracens who were preparing to land at Ostia with the intent to carry out the invasion and destruction of Rome and the papacy.
The Battle of Ostia was won by the Campania League also with the help of a storm that completely destroyed the Saracen fleet off the coast of Ostia.
The Battle of Ostia was one of the most famous in history of the Papacy of the Early Middle Ages and is celebrated in a famous fresco by Raphael, painted by his assistant Giulio Romano, in particular in the Fire in the Borgo of the Vatican Palace in the Vatican City.

See also
Arab raid against Rome
History of Islam in southern Italy
Battle of Ostia
Battle of Garigliano

References

Further reading
Gay, Jules. L'Italie méridionale et l'empire Byzantin. New York: Burt Franklin, 1904. 
Norwich, John Julius. The Normans in the South, 1016–1130. London: Longmans, 1967.
Chalandon, Ferdinand. Histoire de la domination normande en Italie et en Sicilie. Paris, 1907. 

Sorrento, Duchy of